Şingədulan (also, Shingedulan, Shingyadulan, and Shinkyadulan) is a village and municipality in the Lerik Rayon of Azerbaijan.  It has a population of 970.

References 

Populated places in Lerik District